Deep is a given name which may refer to:

 Deep Dasgupta (born 1977), Indian cricketer
 Deep Dhillon, Indian film actor
 Deep Jandu, Canadian singer
 Deep Joshi (born 1947), Indian social worker and activist
 Deep Ng, Hong Kong singer-songwriter and actor
 Deep Roy (born 1957), Kenyan-born dwarf actor
 Deep Saini, Canadian plant physiologist and a vice president of the University of Toronto
 Deep Sengupta (born 1988), Indian chess grandmaster